The Lightning Thief is a musical with music and lyrics by Rob Rokicki and a book by Joe Tracz, based on the 2005 novel of the same name by Rick Riordan. The musical follows Percy Jackson, a 12-year-old boy who newly discovers that he is a demigod and goes on a quest to find Zeus' missing lightning bolt and prevent a war between the Greek gods.

Background
The musical was initially introduced in New York City Off-Broadway at the Lucille Lortel Theatre by Theatreworks USA in 2014 as a one-hour musical, part of its free theatre series, and went on to a national tour. A new version, with a new score and an updated, expanded script was produced with previews from March 23, 2017, and an official opening on April 4 and a last performance on May 6 at the Lucille Lortel Theatre. This production had a new cast, except for Kristin Stokes as Annabeth Chase. The show began a national tour in Chicago in 2019.

The Lightning Thief then played a 16-week limited run on Broadway, beginning previews September 20 and opened on October 16 at the Longacre Theatre, with the national tour cast reprising their roles. The musical closed on Broadway on January 5, 2020, and a national tour was scheduled to begin in late 2020.

The musical premiered in the UK on March 16, 2022 in a production by a theatre group at the University of Leeds.

It has also been adapted to a Japanese version, premiering in Tokyo on September 19, 2022.

Plot

Act 1
Percy Jackson, a 12-year-old boy with ADHD and dyslexia, is on a field trip to the New York Metropolitan Museum of Art. While there, his substitute pre-algebra teacher, Mrs. Dodds, asks to speak with him. Once alone, Mrs. Dodds transforms into a Fury, a mythological Greek demon of Hades. Thanks to a pen that transforms into a sword named Riptide, thrown to Percy by his Latin teacher, Mr. Brunner, Percy manages to fend off and vaporize Mrs. Dodds. After this incident, Percy is expelled from his school due to him failing to stay with the group, and him already being on probation. When Percy tries to explain what happened, he is shocked to find that neither Mr. Brunner, his best friend Grover Underwood, nor anyone else remembers Mrs. Dodds ("Prologue/The Day I Got Expelled"). Percy says goodbye to them and heads home for summer vacation.

Back at his apartment, his mother, Sally Jackson, seems to understand and even forgive Percy's expulsion, while her husband, Gabe Ugliano, does not. Gabe abuses Percy, and Sally confesses she needs to tell him about his father, who left before Percy was born. Percy, extremely bitter about his father and upset with himself for being expelled yet again, laments on his actions, being increasingly hard upon himself. Sally assures Percy the quirks and abnormalities of someone is what makes them special ("Strong"). Sally takes Percy to the beach where she met Percy's father, and the two run into Grover. Shockingly for Percy, Grover turns out to actually be a satyr, a Greek goat-like protector.

Suddenly, a Minotaur (half-bull, half-man) attacks the trio. Sally sacrifices herself so that Percy and Grover can make it to a place she calls "camp". The Minotaur kills Sally right before Percy's eyes who, in vengeance of his mother, finishes him off. Percy is kicked in the head and falls unconscious, where he dreams of a man in a Hawaiian shirt, who gives him a seashell, claiming, "What belongs to the sea can always return" ("The Minotaur/The Weirdest Dream").

When Percy awakes, he finds himself in a place called Camp Half-Blood. The shell the strange man in his dream gifted him remains in his pocket. The camp director, Mr. D (who is actually Dionysus, god of wine and madness), reluctantly explains to Percy that he is a demigod, the son of a human and a Greek god ("Another Terrible Day"). Mr. Brunner (who is really Chiron, an immortal centaur), is also at the camp and explains to Percy that the gods will send a sign to claim him. However, Percy is still skeptical and angry that his father has shown no sign of care for him all these years. Luke Castellan, a nineteen-year-old son of Hermes, sympathizes with Percy, telling him that many half-bloods never know their godly parents, as they are not claimed ("Their Sign").

Percy settles in and meets several other campers such as Silena Beauregard (a daughter of Aphrodite), Katie Gardner (a daughter of Demeter), Clarisse La Rue (a daughter of Ares who takes an immediate disliking to Percy), and Annabeth Chase (a daughter of Athena who took care of Percy while he was unconscious). Annabeth quickly takes the helm of the leader during a game of capture the flag, instructing Percy to sit and wait in the boys' bathroom to assure he won't "mess things up". Clarisse singles him out and tries to "pulverize" him, but the toilets unexpectedly burst to life, dousing her ("Put You in Your Place"). After things settle down, the campers, bar Clarisse, join around the campfire and vent about their unsteady, and in some cases harmful, relationships with both their godly and mortal parents ("Campfire Song").

Percy is claimed as the son of Poseidon, god of the sea, and it is at once rumored that Zeus' lightning bolt has been stolen and Percy is the number one suspect. Percy is told he and two others must go on a quest to retrieve the bolt, to prevent a war between the gods. He is also sent to receive a prophecy from the Oracle of Delphi ("The Oracle"). After the Oracle's prophecy, Percy is upset that he has to leave Camp Half-Blood for a quest that will be unsuccessful, and in turn, externalizes his grievances ("Good Kid"). Percy however, only accepts the quest because Luke hints that his mom will be in the Underworld, the target location of the search since Hades is the rumored real thief. Annabeth and Grover force themselves into the quest, and after a pair of winged shoes is given to them by Luke, the three are pushed into the woods with little care and protection ("Killer Quest!").

Act 2
The three questers have just escaped a bus, attacked by the three Furies. Just after blowing it up, they become hopelessly lost ("Lost!"). In a frantic decision, Percy suggests they should enter Aunty Em's Garden Gnome Emporium. The strange Auntie Em requests to take pictures of the three, but is revealed to actually be Medusa. Percy cuts off her head with his pen/sword, Riptide, and, as a joke, sends the head to the gods over the mail. Annabeth seems particularly upset with this run-in, so while Grover scouts out their surroundings, Percy confronts her about this. She confesses that for her whole life she has been ignored by everyone around her, and is desperate for a chance to prove herself to Athena, her mother, and make the history books ("My Grand Plan").

Grover returns with train tickets to St. Louis and they set off, encountering many dangers such as a Chimera, nasty storms, some dam snacks, and the Lotus Hotel and Casino. They also meet up with Ares, who gives them a lift to Nevada ("Drive"). While on a bus ride to Los Angeles, Percy has a dream of a man speaking with someone whom the man refers to as "my lord". The powerful voice mentions sacrifices and brings up a name, Thalia ("The Weirdest Dream Reprise"). Percy wakes with a jolt and asks Grover if he has ever heard of someone named Thalia. Grover confides that a few years back he was sent to escort Luke, Annabeth and Thalia Grace, Zeus's daughter, to camp. However, the team was attacked, and Grover failed to save Thalia, who ended up sacrificing herself, and being turned into the tree that protects the borders of Camp Half-Blood. He holds himself responsible and thinks Percy will be ashamed of him ("The Tree on the Hill"). Percy assures Grover that no matter who he is or what he does, Percy will always want him as a friend.

The trio arrive in the Underworld, where they are given a tour of the horror by Charon and several long-dead musicians ("DOA"). Percy realizes that the lightning bolt is hidden in his backpack, and the three work out the possibilities of how it could have gotten there. An incident where Percy is nearly dragged into Tartarus by the shoes Luke gave him occurs and the group is discovered. After a brief conversation with an innocent Hades, Percy withdraws the shell from his pocket and blows it, realizing it was from Poseidon, and it opens a portal out of the Underworld. Vowing to return to save his mom, Percy, Annabeth, and Grover escape. Percy hypothesizes that Ares is the one who planted the bolt in his bag and comes to terms with both himself and Poseidon, declaring himself a son of Poseidon, and uses his gift with water and the help of Annabeth and Grover to best Ares ("Son of Poseidon").

The trio return to camp heroes, but Percy couldn't be more troubled. He confides in Luke that he feels just as confused as before, and Luke agrees, stating he felt similar after his own quest. Luke inadvertently tells Percy that he is the true lightning thief and that he has teamed up with Kronos to get back at the gods, who he feels have done him wrong ("The Last Day of Summer"). Luke attacks Percy and escapes. Percy declares that there will be a war no matter how they try to stall it, but he and his friends will be prepared and do whatever it takes to fight it ("Bring on the Monsters").

Principal roles and original cast 

In the album the following people played the following extra characters: James Hayden Rodriguez (Conductor, James Brown, Mozart, and Vienna Boy), Jonathan Raviv/Ryan Knowles (Tractor Guy, Kurt Cobain, and Vienna Boy), Sarah Beth Pfeifer (Reporter, Bianca Di Angelo, Janis Joplin, and Vienna Boy), and Carrie Compere/Jalynn Steele (Echidna).

Musical numbers 
Original Off-Broadway / First US Tour

 "Prologue/The Day I Got Expelled" – Percy, Mr. Brunner, Mrs. Dodds, Grover, and Company
 "Strong" – Sally and Percy
 "The Minotaur/The Weirdest Dream" – Percy, Sally, Grover, and Company
 "Their Sign" – Chiron, Percy, and Luke
 "Put You in Your Place" – Clarisse, Annabeth, Percy, and Company
 "The Oracle" – Oracle and Ensemble
 "Killer Quest!" – Percy, Grover, Annabeth, and Company

 "The Tree on the Hill" – Grover, Thalia, Annabeth, Luke, Percy, and Company
 "In the Same Boat" – Grover, Annabeth, Percy, Ares, and Charon
 "Put You in Your Place" (Reprise) – Ares
 "The Last Day of Summer" (Part 1) – Percy, Annabeth, Grover, Luke, and Company
 "Good Weird" - Percy and Annabeth
 "The Last Day of Summer" (Part 2) – Percy, Annabeth, Grover, and Company
 "The Day I Got Expelled" (Reprise) – Percy and Company

Off-Broadway revival / Second US Tour / Original Broadway

Act 1
 "Prologue/The Day I Got Expelled" – Percy, Mr. Brunner, Mrs. Dodds, Grover, and Company
 "Strong" – Sally and Percy
 "The Minotaur/The Weirdest Dream" – Percy, Sally, Grover, and Company
 "Another Terrible Day" – Mr. D, Percy, and Chiron
 "Their Sign" – Chiron, Percy, and Luke
 "Put You in Your Place" – Clarisse, Annabeth, Percy and Company
 "The Campfire Song" – Luke, Annabeth, Percy, Grover, Katie, Silena, and Chiron
 "The Oracle" – Oracle and Ensemble
 "Good Kid" – Percy and Company
 "Killer Quest!" – Percy, Grover, Annabeth, and Company

Act 2
 "Lost!” – Percy, Annabeth and Grover
 "My Grand Plan" – Annabeth
 "Drive" – Grover, Annabeth, Percy, Ares, and Company
 "The Weirdest Dream" (Reprise) – Percy, Kronos, and Luke
 "The Tree on the Hill" – Grover, Thalia, Annabeth, Luke, Percy, and Company
 "D.O.A." – Charon and Company
 "Son of Poseidon" – Percy, Ares, Annabeth, Grover, Sally, and Company
 "The Last Day of Summer" – Percy, Luke, Annabeth, and Company
 "Bring on the Monsters" – Percy, Annabeth, Grover, Clarisse, Chiron, Silena, and Luke

Recording
The Off-Broadway revival cast album was released on July 7, 2017. For a limited-time, Broadway Records offered a special package that included an official Lightning Thief T-shirt in addition to a physical copy of the cast album.

A deluxe version of the Off-Broadway revival cast album was released on December 6, 2019. The album contains 5 cut songs sung by members of the Broadway cast.

A karaoke album was also released on December 6, containing the songs "Good Kid", "Killer Quest!", "My Grand Plan", "The Tree On The Hill", and "Bring On The Monsters".

Critical response

The Lightning Thief: The Percy Jackson Musical received positive reviews from critics off-Broadway. Fern Siegel, for The Huffington Post, praised the musical for its dialogue, story and cast, calling it "a reminder that Off-Broadway is an important venue for musicals", while Raven Snook, for Time Out, describe it as "worthy of the gods".

Frank Scheck, in reviewing the production for The Hollywood Reporter, wrote that the musical "proves far more enjoyable than the misbegotten 2010 film version or its 2013 sequel" and "also provides an excellent if irreverent introduction to Greek mythology that just might persuade some kids to dig deeper."

The national tour received mostly positive reviews. Chris Jones, of The Chicago Tribune, wrote "the lively pop score has a distinct forward drive, a nice amount of musical diversity and a few terrific balladic showcases for the two top-drawer actor-singers in the show".

The show opened on Broadway to widely negative reviews. Jesse Green, the co-chief theater critic for The New York Times, wrote, "it is both overblown and underproduced, filled with sentiments it can't support and effects it can't pull off". He criticized the show as having "all the charm of a tension headache".

In its limited run at the University of Leeds the musical garnered positive reviews. Particular praise was given to the leads and strong direction and choreography.

Awards and nominations

References

External links 

2017 musicals
Musicals based on novels
Classical mythology in music
Percy Jackson & the Olympians